Few of Us is a 1996 Lithuanian drama film directed by Šarūnas Bartas. It was screened in the Un Certain Regard section at the 1996 Cannes Film Festival. The film shows a young woman visiting a nomadic Tofalar tribe in the Sayan Mountains. There is no dialogue throughout the film.

Cast
 Yekaterina Golubeva
 Piotr Kishteev
 Sergei Tulayev

References

External links

1996 films
1996 drama films
Films set in Russia
Films without speech
Films directed by Šarūnas Bartas
Films produced by Paulo Branco
Lithuanian drama films